The 1935 Philippine presidential and vice presidential elections were held on September 16, 1935. This was the first election since the enactment of the Tydings–McDuffie Act, a law that paved the way for a transitory government, as well as the first nationwide at-large election ever held in the Philippines.

Senate President Manuel Luis Quezon won a lopsided victory against former President Emilio Aguinaldo. His election victory was largely due to the weak political machinations of his rivals. Another losing contender was Gregorio Aglipay, co-founder and supreme bishop of the Iglesia Filipina Indepediente (Philippine Independent Church). Pascual Racuyal, a mechanic by profession, also ran for president as an independent. Quezon's running mate, Senate President Pro Tempore Sergio Osmeña won a more impressive victory as Vice President of the Philippines. He was said to have faced less effective candidates.

Nominations

Nacionalista Party nomination

Candidates gallery 

After the passage of the Hare–Hawes–Cutting Act in the United States in 1933, only requiring approval of the Philippine legislature, the Nacionalista Party was split between the Quezon and Osmeña factions. The Quezon wing, known as the Partido Nacionalista Democratico or Partido Nacionalista Consolidado, was against the act. The Osmeña wing, known as the Partido Nacionalista Pro-Independencia or Partido Nacionalista Democrata Pro-Independencia, was for the passage of the act. Historian Teodoro Agoncillo pointed out that the main reason for Quezon's rejection of the act lay in his anticipation that Osmeña, whose efforts brought the passage of the Hare–Hawes–Cutting Act, might run as President of the transition government slated to be established before granting of independence, resulting to the relegation of himself as second in command once more. Due to Quezon's efforts in the legislature, the Philippines rejected the act and himself promised a better law than the one brought home by Osmeña. His mission to the United States brought forth the passage of the Tydings–McDuffie Act in March 1934, just three months away from the Philippine legislative election, 1934.

The general election on June 5, 1934 turned into a gauge on which wing was supreme. Both factions claimed the Nacionalista label and independence became the central issue. When the results came in, Quezon's wing proved better than that of Osmeña, at least in the national scale. Osmeña faction candidates still dominated the local scene. After the election, the idea of forming a coalition between the two factions, reuniting the old Nacionalista party once more, floated in public discussion.

On June 15, 1935, three months before the scheduled elections for the Commonwealth, both factions held their own national conventions, wherein Quezon was named candidate for president, and Osmeña was named candidate for vice president. According to historian Nick Joaquin, "Osmeña showed greatness in accepting the No. 2 role in a drama where he started out as protagonist." At this, the two factions reconciled as a unified Nacionalista party with an eight-point program.

National Socialist Party nomination

Candidates gallery 

Emilio Aguinaldo, who founded the National Socialist Party in 1934, announced his candidacy for president on June 2, 1935. Raymundo Melliza, former governor of Iloilo, was his running mate. Among those who supported his bid were Sixto Lopez, Anastacio Teodoro, judge Cayetano Lukban, Emiliano Tria Tirona, Narciso Lapuz, Vicente Sotto, and Miguel Cornejo. In Aguinaldo's acceptance speech at Cavite, Cavite, he addressed to an audience of around 5,000 his 44-point platform. His candidacy was also supported by the organization Veteranos de la Revolucion, formed during the administration of Governor-General Leonard Wood by remaining Filipino veterans of the Philippine Revolution and the Philippine–American War.

 – General Emilio Aguinaldo in his acceptance speech, June 1935.

Other parties that supported Aguinaldo's bid was Partido Radical, a left-wing party formed in 1930 by Alfonso Mendoza, and Partido Filipinista, another party founded by Aguinaldo. Mendoza was then representative of Manila's second district.

Republican Party nomination

Candidates gallery 

After his worldwide tour in 1934, wherein Aglipay went to Copenhagen to attend the 11th International Congress of Religious Liberals by the International Association for Religious Freedom (IARF), and even claimed to have interviewed Adolf Hitler and talked with Alejandro Lerroux, Prime Minister of Spain, and Edvard Beneš, President of Czechoslovakia, he expressed his intention to run as President of the Commonwealth. On June 19, 1935, Aglipay announced his candidacy. Thus, Aglipay revived the Republican Party for this purpose, first organized in 1904 but collapsed after the 1907 elections. With this, he also launched his seven-point program.

 – Bishop Gregorio Aglipay in his Manifesto of his candidacy, June 1935.

His bid was supported by the Partido Komunista ng Pilipinas (PKP), a left-wing party organized on November 7, 1930 by Crisanto Evangelista. The PKP fielded Norberto Nabong of Manila as Aglipay's running mate.

Results 

Quezon carried all the provinces except Aguinaldo's home province of Cavite, Camarines Norte and Aglipay's home province of Ilocos Norte. Aguinaldo showed strength in the Bicol provinces in the face of early results, but Quezon eventually triumphed in the region. Aglipay's strength in Nueva Vizcaya nearly won the province for the Republican candidate, yet the Nacionalistas still prevailed. Osmeña also carried all the provinces except Cavite, wherein Melliza won by a close margin. Osmeña's feat is unmatched to date.

While Aglipay quickly accepted the results, Aguinaldo protested about electoral manipulations. He raised the issue up to the United States, and his supporters in Cavite plotted not only a rally to disrupt the inauguration in November, but also launching an assassination attempt against the winners, yet to no avail.

President

Results per province

Vice-President

Results per province

Manila vote 
Manila, as showed in the June 1934 election, leaned to vote for the opposition. First District voted for Gregorio Perfecto, a Democrata, as representative. Second District voted Alfonso Mendoza, a Radical. However, an opposition bailiwick the city could have been, the Nacionalista party won overwhelmingly, whereas it was expected that Aguinaldo and Aglipay will make an upset advantage.

See also 
1935 Philippine legislative election
Commission on Elections
Politics of the Philippines
Elections in the Philippines

References

External links 
 The Philippine Presidency Project
 Official website of the Commission on Elections
 Emilio Aguinaldo on the Presidential Museum and Library
 Manuel L. Quezon on the Presidential Museum and Library

1935
1935 elections in the Philippines